The LAX City Bus Center is the main bus station serving the Los Angeles International Airport (LAX) in Los Angeles, California.

LAX Shuttle route C offers free connections between the LAX City Bus Center and the Central Terminal Area, starting at terminal 1, and servicing the terminals in a counter clockwise direction.

During the overnight hours, Los Angeles Metro line  offers service to Downtown Los Angeles.

On December 7, 2018, a new  bus center was opened near the site of the original. The new platform gave airport managers the room required to build the guideway for the new LAX Automated People Mover. Local transit routes will eventually be moved to the LAX/Metro Transit Center station, which will be connected to the rest of LAX by the Automated People Mover system.

References 

Los Angeles County Metropolitan Transportation Authority
Los Angeles International Airport